The Ana gas field natural gas field located on the continental shelf of the Black Sea. It was discovered in 2010 and developed by Sterling Resources. It will begin production in 2010 and will produce natural gas and condensates. The total proven reserves of the Ana gas field are around 247 billion cubic feet (7.1 km³), and production is slated to be around 110 million cubic feet/day (3.1×106m³) in 2010.

References

Black Sea energy

Natural gas fields in Romania